Thysanotus tuberosus, known as the common fringe-lily is a perennial herb which is endemic to  Australia. The species name tuberosus refers to the crisp tasting edible root.

The leaves are linear in shape, and round at cross section towards the top. The plant grows from 20 cm to 60 cm tall.

It grows in a wide variety of situations, from semi-arid parts of south eastern Australia to coastal areas receiving more than 1300 mm of rain per year. They are often found in open country, heathlands or in dry sclerophyll woodland.

Flowers form from September to April. The three petaled flowers are purple, with frilly edges, and only last for one day. They are among the more colorful wildflowers in south eastern Australia.

Sub-species
The tepals are somewhat longer and wider in subsp. tuberosus, being 10 to 19 mm long, and around 10 mm wide. In subsp. parviflorus the inner anthers are smaller, and straight to slightly curved.

Notes

References 
 
 http://www.friendsoflanecovenationalpark.org.au/Flowering/Flowers/Thysanotus_tuberosus.htm

Asparagales of Australia
Flora of New South Wales
Flora of Queensland
Flora of Victoria (Australia)
Flora of South Australia
Edible plants
Lomandroideae